George Gough Booth (September 24, 1864 – April 11, 1949) was the publisher of the privately held Evening News Association, a co-founder of Booth Newspapers, and a philanthropist.

Biography
He was born on September 24, 1864, in Toronto to Henry Wood Booth.

Booth got his start in the newspaper industry as the son-in-law of James E. Scripps (who, in turn, was the older half-brother and one-time partner of E.W. Scripps). With his two brothers, George started with The Detroit News and, in 1893, founded the independent Booth Newspapers, a chain spanning the southern half of Michigan.

He died on April 11, 1949, in Detroit, Michigan. He was buried in Greenwood Cemetery in Birmingham, Michigan.

Philanthropy
Booth and his wife, Ellen Scripps Booth, founded the Cranbrook Educational Community (CEC) in Bloomfield Hills, Michigan. In 1904, the Booths purchased the site of the present-day CEC as a place for their summer home.  They hired noted architect Albert Kahn to design their country manor, Cranbrook House. As their country estate grew both in purpose and in scale, Booth had both noted architect Eliel Saarinen and renowned sculptor Carl Milles in residence for many years at CEC.

Booth was an avid student of the Arts and Crafts movement and, together, brothers Ralph and George Booth were major benefactors of the Detroit Institute of Arts.

Legacy
Booth Newspapers was sold to Advance Publications, a Samuel I. Newhouse property, in 1976. Evening News Association was eventually sold to the Gannett Company in 1985. MediaNews Group currently owns The Detroit News.

External links

See also
 William Morris Society

References

1864 births
1949 deaths
19th-century American newspaper publishers (people)
American newspaper chain founders
American philanthropists
Cranbrook Educational Community
Scripps family
Burials at Greenwood Cemetery (Birmingham, Michigan)
The Detroit News people
Canadian emigrants to the United States